Mary E. Kramer (born June 14, 1935) is an American former politician. A member of the Republican Party, she served as an Iowa State Senator from 1990 to 2003. She was elected President of the Senate in 1997, becoming the first independently elected woman to fill the post. In 2003 Kramer was nominated by President George W. Bush to serve as U.S. Ambassador to Barbados and the Eastern Caribbean; she was confirmed by the United States Senate and served from 2004 to 2006.

Biography
Mary Kramer was born in Burlington, Iowa on June 14, 1935, and grew up in Iowa City. She holds a Bachelor of Arts degree from the University of Iowa in piano performance and a Master of Arts degree in education, also from the University of Iowa.

For nearly twenty years Kramer worked as a teacher and school administrator in Iowa. In 1975 she entered the corporate sector when she became the Corporate Personnel Director for Younkers, Inc. She joined Wellmark Blue Cross and Blue Shield in 1981, and during her eighteen years with the company served as Vice President of Human Resources and as Vice President of Community Investments.

Political career
Kramer’s political career began in 1990 when she was first elected to the Iowa State Senate, representing Clive, Des Moines and West Des Moines. Her special interests were in education, economic development, and health care. She was elected Assistant Minority Leader in 1992 and President in 1997.

In 2002, President George W. Bush appointed Kramer Chairperson of the White House Commission for Presidential Scholars, and in 2003, the President nominated her as the United States Ambassador to the Seven Island Nations of the Eastern Caribbean.  Kramer held the latter post from 2004 until her retirement in 2006.

Accomplishments
Kramer has served on the Board of the Directors for the State Legislative Leaders Foundation and was the Chairman of the Board for the Senate President’s Forum. She was a member of the Reforming States Group of the Milbank Fund, a group dedicated to population-wide health improvement.  Additionally, she has served as a member of the Board of the Des Moines Club, the Greater Des Moines Chamber of Commerce, United Way of Central Iowa, the Polk County Child Care Resource Center, Brenton Bank, and Mercy Hospital. She is also a lifetime member of the Society for Human Resource Management (SHRM) in Iowa and received the Society’s highest national award in June 1996. In August 2009, Kramer was inducted into the Iowa Women’s Hall of Fame.

Personal
Kramer and her late husband, Kay Kramer, married in 1958. They have a son and a daughter and four grandchildren. Kay Kramer died in November 2018.

Kramer remains active in community affairs and is currently working on a memoir of her experiences in politics.

References

|-

|-

|-

|-

|-

|-

|-

|-

|-

1935 births
Living people
Presidents of the Iowa Senate
Republican Party Iowa state senators
Ambassadors of the United States to Barbados
Women state legislators in Iowa
Ambassadors of the United States to Antigua and Barbuda
Ambassadors of the United States to Dominica
Ambassadors of the United States to Grenada
Ambassadors of the United States to Saint Kitts and Nevis
Ambassadors of the United States to Saint Lucia
Ambassadors of the United States to Saint Vincent and the Grenadines
Politicians from Burlington, Iowa
Politicians from Iowa City, Iowa
University of Iowa alumni
Schoolteachers from Iowa
American women educators
American school administrators
American business executives
Women business executives
American women ambassadors
20th-century American politicians
21st-century American politicians
20th-century American women politicians
21st-century American women politicians
21st-century American diplomats